REC-90 is an ethanol-free, 90 octane unleaded gasoline blend designed for use in recreational/marine engines which can be damaged by the ethanol found in other gasoline blends.  It is also usable in some aviation engines  and automotive engines, though it has not been thoroughly tested for cars and trucks.

Unlike most stations in the plains states which carry ethanol-free 87 octane unleaded alongside 10% ethanol 87 octane unleaded, many states carry ethanol-free gasoline specifically marketed as recreational fuel designed for marine equipment and small engines.

Rec-90 Availability and Pricing

As debate has ensued over ethanol blending in gasolines, ethanol-free has popped up in a number of states marketed as Rec-90 Recreational Gasoline. Because there is no cheap oxygenate in Rec-90 gasoline, Rec-90 is almost always significantly more expensive per gallon than E10 "Regular Gasoline".

According to the crowd-sourced website e85prices.com, there are several dozen stations known in the United States to carry ethanol-free fuel. The following is a table listing the number of known stations in each state to carry ethanol-free fuel.

List of states with known number of ethanol-free gasoline or Rec-90 stations
This list shows only a few of the thousands of stations with ethanol-free gas. See the link below for Pure-Gas.Org for a more complete list.

References

External links
Pure-Gas.Org is a list of gas stations that sell ethanol free gas.
 Materials Safety Data Sheet (Marathon)

Gasoline engines
Fuel additives
Ethanol fuel